The Pickpocket (transliterated as Sareq al-Ma’faza) is an Egyptian film released on February 2, 1970. The film is directed and written by Zoheir Bakir, features a screenplay by Yousry Hakim, and stars Rushdy Abaza, Soheir El-Morshidy, Mervat Amin, and Nabil Al-Hajrasi.

Cast
 Rushdy Abaza (Tariq)
 Soheir El-Morshidy (Souad)
 Mervat Amin (Ehsan)
 Nabil Al-Hajrasi (Jamil)

Synopsis
Tariq al-Fangari is a miserly man whose sisters suffer from his parsimony. When police shoot a pickpocket to death on a bus, the man’s wallet is swapped for that of Tariq and his siblings think that he is the deceased, leading him to ponder his life.

External links
 El Cinema page
 Dhliz page

References

Egyptian black-and-white films
1970 films